WHTX may refer to:

 WKST-FM, a Pittsburgh, Pennsylvania radio station that carried the calls from 1983 until 1991.
 WAKZ, a Youngstown, Ohio station that carried the calls from 1992 until 1994.
 WHTX-LP, a Springfield, Massachusetts low-power repeater station for Hartford CT TV station WUVN.
 WHTX (AM), a Warren, Ohio station that has used the calls since January 2011, formerly WANR.